The 1991–92 Cymru Alliance was the second season of the Cymru Alliance after its establishment in 1990. The league was won by Caersws. This season also saw the league extended to 16 teams.

League table

External links
Cymru Alliance

Cymru Alliance seasons
2
Wales